Gary Bohay (born December 26, 1960 in Burnaby, British Columbia) is a former Canadian Olympic wrestler. In 1988, he won the gold medal in the Canada Cup, which was considered a warm up for the 1988 Summer Olympics. Following the Cup, he participated in the 1988 Summer Olympic Games in Seoul, South Korea, where he was overall 8th ranked in the world. He was also the 1989 Canada Cup bronze medalist. Bohay's greatest achievement was a silver medal at the 1989 World Championships in Martigny, Switzerland, where he was defeated in the finals by John Smith (wrestler) of the United States who was a future two-time Olympic gold medalist and four-time world champion.

In 1985, Bohay was a member on the World Team during his competition in Budapest, Hungary where he did not place.

During 1983 at Arizona State University, he was named an All-American.

Bohay was inducted into the Canada Lutte Hall of Fame in 2001.

Currently, he is a practicing medical doctor in Tucson, Arizona.

References

External links
National Wrestling Hall of Fame

1960 births
Arizona State Sun Devils wrestlers
Living people
Olympic wrestlers of Canada
Sportspeople from Burnaby
Wrestlers at the 1988 Summer Olympics
Canadian male sport wrestlers